Brandon Marsel Scheunemann (born 9 March 2005) is an Indonesian professional footballer who plays as a centre-back for Liga 1 club PSIS Semarang. Brandon is the son of Timo Scheunemann.

Club career

Youth 
As a youth player, he played for SSB Putra Gemilang and the Ricky Nelson Academy.

PSIS Semarang 
He was signed for PSIS Semarang to play in half season 2022–23 Liga 1. Brandon made his professional debut on 21 January 2023 in a match against Arema at the Jatidiri Stadium, Semarang.

International career 
In January 2023, Brandon was called up to the Indonesia U20 for the training centre in preparation for 2023 AFC U-20 Asian Cup. He is eligible to represent Germany internationally.

Career statistics

Club

References

External links
 Brandon Scheunemann at Soccerway

2005 births
Living people
Indonesian people of German descent
Indonesian footballers
Association football central defenders
Liga 1 (Indonesia) players
PSIS Semarang players
People from Malang
Sportspeople from East Java